The 1924–25 Princeton Tigers men's basketball team represented Princeton University in intercollegiate college basketball during the 1924–25 NCAA men's basketball season. The head coach was Albert Wittmer and the team captain was Stephen Cleaves. The team played its home games in the University Gymnasium on the university campus in Princeton, New Jersey.  The team was the winner of the Eastern Intercollegiate Basketball League (EIBL) and is considered the retroactive national champion by the Helms Athletic Foundation and the Premo-Porretta Power Poll.

The team posted a 21–2 overall record and a 9–1 conference record.

Two-time All-American Arthur Loeb set numerous records, including the school record for career free throws made (342) that would stand until Harold Haabestad, Jr. totaled 376 during his career that ended with the 1954–55 season.

References

Princeton Tigers men's basketball seasons
Princeton Tigers
NCAA Division I men's basketball tournament championship seasons
Prince
Prince